Jayon Lee Brown (born February 26, 1995) is an American football middle linebacker for the Las Vegas Raiders of the National Football League (NFL). He was drafted by the Tennessee Titans in the fifth round of the 2017 NFL Draft, after playing college football at UCLA.

Early life
Brown was born on February 26, 1995. His younger brother, Joshua, is a linebacker at the University of Arizona, and his two older brothers, Jason and Juwuan, also played college football. Jason played linebacker at Idaho, while Juwuan was a defensive lineman at Southern Oregon. Brown attended Long Beach Polytechnic High School in Long Beach, California.

College career
In four seasons at UCLA, Brown appeared in 49 games with 21 starts and totaled 220 tackles, three sacks, nine tackles for loss, three interceptions, 15 passes defensed, one forced fumble and four fumble recoveries. He started 21 games over his final two seasons and totaled nine games with double-digit tackles.

Freshman season
As a freshman, Brown appeared in all 13 games as a special teams player and reserve linebacker and made six tackles on the season. He was presented with the John Boncheff, Jr. Award for Rookie of the Year on special teams at the team's annual banquet and earned a spot on the Athletic Director’s Academic Honor Roll.

Sophomore season
As a sophomore, Brown saw action in 12 games, primarily as a special teams player. He was credited with two tackles on the year and returned five kickoffs for 42 total yards.

Junior season
As a junior, Brown saw action in 12 games with nine starts, entering the starting lineup after an injury to Myles Jack. He led the team with 93 tackles and ranked second on the squad with six passes defensed.

Senior season
As a senior, Brown played and started 12 games and led the Bruins with 119 tackles, which tied for 16th on the all-time school single-season list. He added 2.5 sacks, seven tackles for loss (ranked third on team), three interceptions (ranked third on team), 23 passes defensed and two fumble recoveries. He was named first-team All-Pac-12 Conference. Additionally, he ranked ninth in the country and led the Pac-12 with 9.9 total tackles per game. Also, he tied for 10th in the Pac-12 in interceptions and became the first UCLA player with 100 tackles in a season since Eric Kendricks (149) in 2014.

Brown graduated from UCLA in spring 2017 with a degree in political science.

Professional career

Tennessee Titans
The Tennessee Titans selected Brown in the fifth round, (155th overall) of the 2017 NFL Draft. The Tennessee Titans traded their fifth (164th overall) and sixth round picks (214th overall) to the Philadelphia Eagles  and drafted Brown with the fifth round pick (155th overall) they received in return. Brown was the 19th linebacker drafted in 2017.

2017 season
On May 23, 2017, the Titans signed Brown to a four-year, $2.67 million contract that includes a signing bonus $271,553.

During training camp, Brown competed for a role as a backup inside linebacker against Daren Bates and Nate Palmer. Head coach Mike Mularkey named Brown the primary backup inside linebacker to begin the regular season, behind starters Wesley Woodyard and Avery Williamson.

Brown made his NFL debut in the Titans' season-opener against the Oakland Raiders and made four combined tackles during a 26–16 loss. In Week 9, he collected a season-high six combined tackles as the Titans defeated the Baltimore Ravens by a score of 23–20. In Week 12, Brown made two combined tackles and made his first career sack during a 20–16 road win at the Indianapolis Colts. Brown was credited with half a sack after he sacked Colts' quarterback Jacoby Brissett for a three-yard loss during the first quarter with teammate Derrick Morgan. In Week 15, Brown recorded five solo tackles and made the first solo sack of his career by sacking quarterback Jimmy Garoppolo during the fourth quarter during a 25–23 loss at the San Francisco 49ers.

Brown finished his rookie year with 52 combined tackles (38 solo), four pass deflections, and 1.5 sacks in 16 games and no starts. Brown was used extensively in nickel packages as a rookie under defensive coordinator Dick LeBeau due to his athleticism and tackling ability. He finished the season with 487 defensive snaps (44.7%) while also appearing on special teams.

The Titans finished second in the AFC South with a 9–7 record and earned a wildcard berth. On January 6, 2018, Brown appeared in his first NFL playoff game and recorded three combined tackles as the Titans defeated the Kansas City Chiefs 22–21 in the AFC Wildcard Game to end a 14-year playoff victory drought. The following week, he made one tackle and deflected a pass as the Titans lost 35–14 at the New England Patriots in the AFC Divisional Round. On January 15, 2018, the Titans fired Mularkey.

2018 season
On January 20, 2018, the Titans hired Houston Texans' defensive coordinator Mike Vrabel to be their new head coach. Ten days later, the Titans hired Baltimore Ravens' defensive coordinator Dean Pees to be their new defensive coordinator after Dick LeBeau retired. Throughout training camp, Brown competed to be a starting inside linebacker against offseason acquisition Will Compton and first-round pick Rashaan Evans. Head coach Mike Vrabel named Brown the backup inside linebacker to start the regular season, behind veterans Wesley Woodyard and Will Compton.

On September 30, 2018, Brown earned his first NFL start and recorded ten combined tackles (six solo) and one sack during a 26–23 overtime victory against the Philadelphia Eagles. The following week, Brown collected a season-high-tying ten combined tackles (eight solo) and another sack as the Titans lost 13–12 at the Buffalo Bills. After a Week 8 bye, Brown made four combined tackles and strip-sacked on quarterback Dak Prescott to mark the first of his career during a 28–14 win at the Dallas Cowboys. Pees continued to use Brown in nickel situations as a hybrid linebacker in 2018. In the regular-season finale against the Indianapolis Colts, Brown had his first NFL interception by picking off Andrew Luck and returned it 22 yards for a touchdown. He later forced a fumble and recovered it.

In 2018, he finished second on the defense with 107 tackles and six sacks, and his 18 quarterback pressures tied for the second-highest total on the team. He was one of only six NFL linebackers with at least six sacks, one interception, one forced fumble and one fumble recovery during the season.

2019 season

During Week 4 against the Atlanta Falcons, Brown recorded his first sack of the season on Matt Ryan in the 24–10 road victory. During Week 14 against the Oakland Raiders, he recovered a fumble forced by teammate Tye Smith on tight end Darren Waller and returned it for a 46 yard touchdown in the 42–21 road victory. In the next game against the Houston Texans, Brown recorded his first interception of the season off a pass thrown by Deshaun Watson in the 24–21 loss.

Brown finished his third season with 105 tackles, a sack, eight pass deflections, an interception, and a fumble recovery returned for a touchdowns in 14 games and starts.

2020 season
Brown was placed on the team's active/physically unable to perform list at the start of training camp on July 28, 2020, and was activated eight days later.

In Week 7 against the Pittsburgh Steelers, Brown recorded his first interception of the season off a pass thrown by Ben Roethlisberger during the 27–24 loss.
In Week 9 against the Chicago Bears, Brown recorded a team high 11 tackles, sacked Nick Foles once, and forced a fumble on wide receiver Anthony Miller that was recovered by the Titans during the 24–17 win. In Week 11, Brown suffered a dislocated and fractured elbow and was placed on season-ending injured reserve on November 24, 2020.

2021 season
Brown re-signed with the Titans on a one-year contract on March 19, 2021. He was placed on injured reserve on October 8, 2021 with a knee injury. He was activated on November 6.

Las Vegas Raiders
On March 24, 2022, Brown signed a one-year contract with the Las Vegas Raiders. He was named a starting linebacker in 2022. He was placed on injured reserve on December 13, 2022.

NFL career statistics

Personal life
Brown likes spending as much time as possible with his dogs, “a mutt named Lou” and a Rottweiler named Kali. He also enjoys puzzles and watching movies.

References

External links
Las Vegas Raiders bio
UCLA Bruins bio

1995 births
Living people
American football linebackers
Players of American football from Long Beach, California
Tennessee Titans players
UCLA Bruins football players
Las Vegas Raiders players
Long Beach Polytechnic High School alumni